Yamakage is a Japanese surname. Notable people with the surname include:

, Japanese speed skater
, Japanese swimmer

Japanese-language surnames